Fersman is a large lunar impact crater on the Moon's far side. It lies to the east of the crater Poynting, and west-northwest of Weyl. To the south is the huge walled plain Hertzsprung.

This is a worn crater with a low, outer rim. The southeast rim and the eastern interior floor are marked by ejecta deposits that trend from southeast to northwest. There is also a nearly linear series of small craters that begin to the southeast of the crater, and continue about 100 km to the northwest of the crater. There is a break in this chain across the crater's interior floor, then it continues again near the northern rim.

Several other small craters lie across the interior floor, including a grouping to the south of the midpoint. The rim has an outward bulge along the southeast side and irregular edges to the north and south. A small crater lies along the western inner wall.

References

External links
 

Impact craters on the Moon